Sadri Ertem (1898 – 12 November 1943) was a Turkish writer and Kemalist politician, who was one of the early key members of the CHP.

References 

1898 births
1943 deaths
Writers from Istanbul
Republican People's Party (Turkey) politicians
Turkish male writers
Politicians from Istanbul